How to Live with Your Parents (For the Rest of Your Life) is an American single-camera sitcom created by Accidentally on Purpose creator Claudia Lonow that aired on ABC from April 3 to June 26, 2013. The series was produced by 20th Century Fox Television and stars Sarah Chalke as Polly who—along with her daughter—ends up moving into her parents' house because of the financial crisis and her divorce. On May 10, 2013, How to Live with Your Parents (For the Rest of Your Life) was canceled by ABC after one season.

Premise
The series follows a single and very uptight divorced mother, Polly (Chalke) who finds herself moving back in with her parents, Elaine and Max (Elizabeth Perkins and Brad Garrett), upon leaving her husband and due to the economic downturn. Polly's parents are laid back and relaxed, but the return is not as smooth and transitional as she thinks while having to deal with not only her parents and their lifestyle, but also with a best friend whom she almost dated and an ex-husband who wants her back.

Cast and characters
 Sarah Chalke as Polly, a divorced mother.
 Elizabeth Perkins as Elaine Green, Polly's mother and Natalie's grandmother.
 Brad Garrett as Max Green, Elaine's husband and Polly's step-father.
 Rachel Eggleston as Natalie Tatham, Polly's daughter and Elaine's granddaughter.
 Jon Dore as Julian Tatham, Polly's ex-husband.
 Stephanie Hunt as Jenn, Polly's co-worker and friend.

Development and production
In January 2012, ABC placed a pilot order for How to Live with Your Parents (For the Rest of Your Life). Claudia Lonow wrote the pilot episode, and serves as showrunner and head writer. Lonow also executive produces the series alongside Brian Grazer and Francie Calfo, under their production company Imagine Entertainment.

Casting announcements began in February 2012, with Sarah Chalke first cast in the lead role of Polly, the recently divorced mother who moves back in with her parents. Jon Dore then joined the series in the role of Julian, Polly's ex-husband. Following Dore, Elizabeth Perkins signed on to play the role of Elaine, Polly's optimistic and outspoken mother. Next to board the series was Rachel Eggleston as Natalie, Polly and Julian's six-year-old daughter. Brad Garrett then joined the series as Max, Polly's stepfather, who owns a successful chain of nightclubs. Rebecca Delgado Smith boarded the series in the role of Jenn, Polly's co-worker who occasionally helps Polly with her dating problems. Orlando Jones completed the main cast in the series when he signed on to play the role of Gregg, Polly's married best friend and co-worker.

On May 11, 2012, ABC placed a series order for the comedy. Shortly after the series order was placed, Rebecca Delgado Smith and Orlando Jones were dropped from the cast. Smith's role was subsequently recast with Stephanie Hunt. The series went into production early and the first season was completed by November 2012.

Episodes

References

External links
 

2010s American single-camera sitcoms
2013 American television series debuts
2013 American television series endings
American Broadcasting Company original programming
English-language television shows
Television series by 20th Century Fox Television
Television series by Imagine Entertainment